Petr Sommer (born 30 November 1949 in Rakovník) is a Czech historian and archaeologist. He focuses on church archaeology, spiritual culture of the Middle Ages and its reflection in archaeological sources.

Life and research
Petr Sommer studied history and prehistory at the Faculty of Arts of Charles University in Prague and later he worked as archaeologist for the Museum of East Bohemia in Pardubice and for the City of Prague Museum. In 1976, he started to work for the Institute of Archaeology of the Czechoslovak Academy of Sciences and he became its director (then already part of Czech Academy of Sciences) the in 1993–1998. Then, he was the deputy director of the Centre for Medieval Studies in Prague (since its founding in 1998) and became the head in 2004.

In his research, he studies the Christianisation of Přemyslid Bohemia, monastic architecture, and life in monasteries in the early medieval period. He led research into the oldest Czech monasteries (Břevnov, Strahov, Ostrov near Davle, Beroun, Sázava). His work demonstrates his understanding of medieval studies as an interdisciplinary cooperation, in this case a cooperation between archaeologists, historians, and art historians in interpreting the arrival of Christianity to the Czech lands, and the related activities of the oldest monastic communities. He focuses special attention on the medieval Sázava Abbey and the associated figure of St. Procopius.

Petr Sommer was recognized for his work many times, most recently receiving the Česká hlava National Prize for Science (2017).

Selected bibliography
 Krypta kláštera v Břevnově – Krypta des Klosters in Břevnov – The Crypt of Břevnov Convent – Krypta monastyrja v Brževnove. Praha 1985 (with Dana Stehliková).
 Sázavský klášter. Praha : Unicornis, 1996. 62 s.
 Začátky křesťanství v Čechách : Kapitoly z dějiny raně středověké duchovní kultury. Praha : Garamond, 2001. 174 s. .
 České země v raném středověku. Praha : Nakladatelství Lidové noviny, 2006. 243 s. . (editor)
 Svatý Prokop : Z počátku českého státu a církve. Praha : Vyšehrad, 2007. 337 s. .
 Přemyslovci : Budování českého státu. Praha : Nakladatelství Lidové noviny, 2009. 778 s. . (with Dušan Třeštík and Josef Žemlička)
 Kostely na Sedlčansku. Sedlčany : Městské muzeum Sedlčany, 2011. 165 s. .

References

1949 births
Living people
21st-century Czech historians
20th-century archaeologists
20th-century Czech historians
Czech archaeologists
Czech medievalists
People from Rakovník
Charles University alumni
Academic staff of Charles University